Early golf clubs were all made of wood. They were hand-crafted, often by the players themselves, and had no standard shape or form. As the sport of golf developed, a standard set of clubs began to take shape, with different clubs being fashioned to perform different tasks and hit various types of shot. Later, as more malleable iron became widely used for shorter-range clubs, an even wider variety of clubs became available.

Many of the clubs manufactured between 1901 and 1935 came from Scotland, but more and more started coming from larger US manufacturers.

These early clubs had hickory shafts and wrapped leather grips. To secure the joins between the shaft and the head of the club, and between the grip and the shaft, whipping of black, waxed linen thread was used. Pre-1900 clubs (smooth-faced gutty era) used 7-ply thread. Clubs from the era 1900 to 1935 required 4-ply thread.

From 1924 golf clubs started to be manufactured with shafts of steel, pyratone, aluminum, and fiberglass or resin; many of them were given a wood-look coating.

Woods
Wooden clubs generally had a metal base-plate and were made heavier with a lead insert into the back of the head; often the face of the club had an insert of bone or ivory to reduce the wear from impact on the wood.

They were:
 Play club: Driver
 Brassie: so called because the base-plate was of brass; equivalent to a 3 Wood 
 Spoon: Higher-lofted wood; equivalent to a 5 Wood
 Baffing spoon or a Baffy: Approach wood; equivalent to a 7 Wood

These were made of wood and were used until they were replaced by the numbered system used today.

20th century wood-shafted irons
They were:
 Driving iron: 1 Iron 
 Mid-iron: 2 Iron 
 Mid-mashie: 3 Iron 
 Mashie iron: 4 Iron 
 Mashie: 5 Iron 
 Spade mashie: 6 Iron 
 Mashie-niblick: 7 Iron 
 Pitching niblick: 8 Iron 
 Niblick: 9 Iron 
 Jigger: Very low lofted iron, shortened shaft, similar to a modern chipper

"Mashie" is derived from French massue, "club", while "niblick" is diminutive of neb/nib, "little nose."

19th century irons
 Cleek – A metal-headed golf club having an elongated blade with little loft, equivalent to a one or two iron in a modern set of clubs.
 Lofter – A metal-headed golf club with a moderate loft ranging from a modern five iron to an eight iron.
 Niblick or Rut Niblick – a trouble club and pitching iron and generally the most lofted of the 19th century irons, with a very small rounded head and a loft equivalent to a modern nine iron or wedge.

The traditional set of irons was invented by Archibald Barrie, and were used from 1903 until about the 1940s. The introduction of the standardized numbered iron set produced by the Spalding Sporting Goods Company in the early 1930s caused the traditional set of irons to give way gradually to the numbered set.

The traditional irons varied greatly in loft (± 5°). The shape of the head determined some of the playing characteristics of the club; most traditional heads were roughly egg-shaped.

Sabbath sticks
Sunday sticks or sabbath sticks were the golf enthusiast's answer to the Church of Scotland's discouragement of golfing on Sundays. Clubs were disguised as walking sticks, the club head comfortably fitting into the palm of the golfer's hand, until when the golfer was unobserved, the stick was reversed and a few strokes were played.

See also 
 Hickory golf

References

External links 
 Golf.about.com
 Imdb.com:  How I Play Golf, by Bobby Jones No. 4: 'the Mashie Niblick'
 P4a.com
 Leaderboard.com
 Leaderboard.com
 Independent.co.uk

Golf clubs